Pillarno (Asturian: Piarnu) is one of eight parishes (administrative divisions) in Castrillón, a municipality within the province and autonomous community of Asturias, in northern Spain. 

The population is 791 (INE 2005).

References

Parishes in Castrillón